Leighton is a given name. Notable people with the name include:

Leighton Baines (born 1984), English footballer
Leighton Clarkson (born 2001), English footballer
Leighton Dye (1901–1977), American hurdler
Leighton A. Hope (1921–1998), New York politician
Leighton James (born 1953), Welsh footballer
Leighton Meester (born 1986), American actress, singer and model
Leighton Phillips (born 1949), Welsh footballer
Leighton Rees (1940–2003), Welsh dart player
Leighton Schubert (born c. 1982), Texas politician
Leighton Vander Esch (born 1997), American football player
Leighton Walsh (born 1982), DJ better known by the stage name Walshy Fire

See also
 Lleyton (given name)
 Layton (given name)